KBJS (90.3 FM) is a radio station  broadcasting a Christian radio format. Licensed to Jacksonville, Texas, United States, the station serves the Tyler-Longview area.  The station is currently owned by East Texas Media Association, Inc.

References

External links
 Official site

BJS